Cheshmeh Kabud, Delfan may refer to:

 Cheshmeh Kabud, Itivand-e Shomali
 Cheshmeh Kabud, Kakavand-e Sharqi
 Cheshmeh Kabud, Mirbag-e Shomali